"Path" is a song by Finnish symphonic metal band Apocalyptica and a single from their 2000 album Cult. It was originally released in 2000 as an instrumental which also has a music video. The release also included "Hall of Mountain King" from Cult, a cover of Edvard Grieg, Peer Gynt, Op. 23, Act II, Pt. 5. In 2001, "Path Vol. 1 & 2" was released, where the original version was renamed "Path Vol. 1" and "Path Vol. 2" was added, a version with vocals sung and features Sandra Nasić.

Track listing

Charts

References

2000 singles
Apocalyptica songs
2000 songs
Songs written by Eicca Toppinen